Big Rubble: The Deadly City is a boxed tabletop role-playing game supplement for RuneQuest. Originally published by Chaosium in 1983. It was republished in 1999 by Moon Design Publications in a single volume with Pavis: Threshold to Danger as Gloranthan Classics Volume I – Pavis & Big Rubble . The 1983 edition was republished in 2019 in PDF format as part of Chaosium's RuneQuest: Classic Edition Kickstarter.

Contents
Big Rubble: The Deadly City describes "The Rubble", 25 square kilometres of supposedly treasure-filled ancient ruin that surrounds the small town of Pavis. The supplement includes 
 16-page booklet Common Knowledge for the Players
 32-page Guide for the Gamemaster
 92-page Episodes for the Gamemaster, containing seven adventure scenarios written by eight different authors
 a 17" x 22" fold-out map

Reception
In the November 1983 edition of White Dwarf (Issue #47), Oliver Dickinson gave some parts of the supplement an excellent rating of 10 out of 10, especially two of the included scenarios, and rated most of the rest of the contents 8–9, although he thought some of the scenarios were below average, only worth 5–6.

In the February 1984 edition of Dragon, Steve List liked the variety of scenarios, although he found one of them "a little out of place" since it involves travel outside of the area covered by the supplement. List concluded with a strong recommendation, saying, "Big Rubble is one of the best scenario packages I have seen. It is well-produced in a physical sense, and it is well-written and well-planned. As a blend of self-contained scenarios and open-ended setting, it is a valuable addition to the Runequest library.

Reviews
Fantasy Gamer #4 (Feb./March, 1984)

References

External links
 

Role-playing game supplements introduced in 1983
RuneQuest 2nd edition supplements